Marno Allika (born 18 February 1982) is an Estonian fencer.

He was born in Haapsalu. In 2004 he graduated from Estonian Maritime Academy in hydrography.

He began his fencing career in 1989, coached by Endel Nelis. Later his coach was Hardo Lehis. He won silver medal at 2015 European Fencing Championships in team épée. He is multiple-times Estonian champion. Since 2006 he is a member of Estonian national fencing team.

References

Living people
1982 births
Estonian male épée fencers
Sportspeople from Haapsalu
21st-century Estonian people